Swannington Upgate Common is a  biological Site of Special Scientific Interest north-west of Norwich in Norfolk.

This site has varied habitats including glacial sands and gravels, peat, dry and wet heath, woodland, grassland, ponds and a stream. There is a wide range of breeding birds.

The site is open to the public.

References

Sites of Special Scientific Interest in Norfolk